Julio Iemma (born 31 July 1984) is a Venezuelan sports shooter. He competed in the men's 10 metre air rifle event at the 2016 Summer Olympics.

References

External links
 

1984 births
Living people
Venezuelan male sport shooters
Olympic shooters of Venezuela
Shooters at the 2016 Summer Olympics
Place of birth missing (living people)
Pan American Games medalists in shooting
Pan American Games silver medalists for Venezuela
Shooters at the 2015 Pan American Games
South American Games silver medalists for Venezuela
South American Games medalists in shooting
Competitors at the 2014 South American Games
Medalists at the 2015 Pan American Games
Shooters at the 2020 Summer Olympics
20th-century Venezuelan people
21st-century Venezuelan people